Wealth is the abundance of valuable resources or material possessions.

Wealth may also refer to:

 Wealth (film), a 1921 American film directed by William Desmond Taylor
 Gospel of Wealth, an essay by Andrew Carnegie
 Plutus (play) or Wealth, a comedy by Aristophanes
 WealthTV, a cable television channel in the United States

See also
 Wealthy (disambiguation)
 Affluence (disambiguation)
 Affluent (disambiguation)